Pichcacocha Lakes or Pichgacocha Lakes (possibly from Quechua pichqa five qucha lake) is a group of five lakes in Peru. They lie in the Huánuco Region, Ambo Province, Conchamarca District.

References 

Lakes of Peru
Lakes of Huánuco Region